Wanderley Magalhães Azevedo (8 October 1966 – 28 March 2006) was a Brazilian professional racing cyclist. He rode the 1994 Tour de France. He also competed at the 1988 Summer Olympics and 1992 Summer Olympics.

Major results

1986
 1st Rutas de América
 5th Volta a Portugal
1988
 1st Tour de Santa Catarina
1989
 1st Prova Ciclística 9 de Julho
1990
 1st Prova Ciclística 9 de Julho
1991
 Pan American, Individual Road Race
 1st Prova Ciclística 9 de Julho
 1st Tour de Santa Catarina
1992
 2nd Prova Ciclística 9 de Julho

References

External links

1966 births
2006 deaths
Brazilian male cyclists
Brazilian road racing cyclists
Sportspeople from Goiânia
Olympic cyclists of Brazil
Cyclists at the 1988 Summer Olympics
Cyclists at the 1992 Summer Olympics
Pan American Games bronze medalists for Brazil
Pan American Games medalists in cycling
Cyclists at the 1991 Pan American Games
Medalists at the 1991 Pan American Games
20th-century Brazilian people
21st-century Brazilian people